Joseph Edmund Deakin (6 February 1879 – 30 June 1972) was a British athlete who competed at the 1908 Summer Olympics in London.

Deakin served with the Rifle Brigade and fought in the Boer War. During this time he set South African records at both the 880 yards and 1 mile. While posted to Ireland, he ran with Clonliffe Harriers and won the Irish 1 mile and 4 mile titles in 1901. Returning to England, he joined Herne Hill Harriers in 1903 and soon established a reputation as one of the country's finest cross-country runners, winning an individual bronze (1905) and team gold medals (1905, 1906 and 1908) at the International Cross Country Championships.

He finished second in the English national cross-country championships in 1907 and showed sufficient form in track races during the early part of the 1908 season to be selected to race in three events at the Olympic Games. Deakin won his first round heat of the 1500 metres event with a time of 4:13.6. Despite being one of the slowest first round winners, Deakin won by seventy-five yards. His time in the final was better, though he still finished sixth at 4:07.9. The next morning Deakin led the British team home to victory in the 3 mile team race. After a celebratory lunch, complete with champagne refreshment, he lined for the heats of the five miles competition. Unsurprisingly, he dropped out of the race before the finish.

Deakin joined Surrey AC after the Olympics and competed for his new club in the Polytechnic Marathon. He finished in 20th place. After service in World War I, which saw him temporarily blinded, he returned to racing and improved his previous marathon performance by finishing 8th in the 1920 "Poly". He continued in competition as a veteran and his last race was not until the eve of his 90th birthday. He died just three years after his last race.

References

Further reading

See also
Herne Hill Harriers

1879 births
1972 deaths
British male middle-distance runners
Olympic athletes of Great Britain
Athletes (track and field) at the 1908 Summer Olympics
Olympic gold medallists for Great Britain
English Olympic medallists
British Army personnel of the Second Boer War
British Army personnel of World War I
People from Shelton, Staffordshire
Sportspeople from Stoke-on-Trent
Medalists at the 1908 Summer Olympics
Olympic gold medalists in athletics (track and field)
Rifle Brigade soldiers